Presidential elections were held in Montenegro on 11 May 2003. They were the third such elections in six months, as those held in December 2002 and February 2003 had been declared invalid due to voter turnouts of less than 50%. For the May election, the turnout rule was abolished. The result was a victory for Filip Vujanović, who was nominated by the Democratic Party of Socialists of Montenegro and Social Democratic Party of Montenegro, who received 64.2% of the vote. Vujanović had also won both previous votes by a large margin. The elections were boycotted by the opposition Together for Change coalition.

Results
Although Dragan Hajduković was a member of the Greens of Montenegro, he ran as an independent.

References

2003 05
Montenegro
President 2
2003 05
Montenegro